The 1942 Design Light Fleet Carrier, commonly referred to as the British Light Fleet Carrier, was a light aircraft carrier design created by the Royal Navy during the Second World War, and used by eight naval forces between 1944 and 2001. They were designed and constructed by civilian shipyards to serve as an intermediate step between the expensive, full-size fleet aircraft carriers and the less expensive but limited-capability escort carriers.

Sixteen Light Fleet carriers were ordered, and all were laid down to the Colossus class design during 1942 and 1943. However, only eight were completed to this design; of these, four entered service before the end of the war, and none saw front line operations. Two more were fitted with maintenance and repair facilities instead of aircraft catapults and arresting gear, and entered service as aircraft maintenance carriers. The final six were modified during construction to handle larger and faster aircraft, and were re-designated as the Majestic class. The construction of the six ships was suspended at the end of the war. Five were eventually completed with the last commissioning in 1961; however, the sixth, Leviathan, was dismantled for spare parts and scrap.

Although not completed in time to fight in the war, the carriers in Royal Navy service participated in the Korean War and the Suez Crisis. During the latter, two Colossus-class ships performed the first ship-based helicopter assault in history. Four Colossuses and all five completed Majestics were loaned or sold to seven foreign nations – Argentina, Australia, Brazil, Canada, France, India, and the Netherlands – with three ships serving in three different naval forces during their careers. Foreign-operated Light Fleets took part in the Korean War, the First Indochina War, the Vietnam War, the Indo-Pakistani War of 1971, and the Falklands War.

Despite being intended as 'disposable warships', all of the completed Light Fleet carriers exceeded their planned three-year service life. The maintenance carriers were the first to be paid off in the 1950s, and by the 1960s, all of the Royal Navy carriers, (bar , which was later recommissioned as a repair ship) had been sold to other nations or for ship breaking. The carriers in other navies had longer service lives. At the time of her decommissioning in 2001, Minas Gerais was the oldest active aircraft carrier in the world. Despite attempts to preserve several of these carriers as museum ships, the last surviving example, was sold for scrapping in 2014.

Design and construction
Experiences during the early part of the Second World War had demonstrated to the British that the Royal Navy needed access to defensive air cover for Allied fleets and convoys, which could only be provided by more aircraft carriers. In mid-1941, the Director of Naval Construction was instructed to investigate how best to achieve this without the lengthy construction times normally associated with carriers. The options were to refit the surviving Hawkins-class cruisers with flight decks and aviation facilities, convert additional merchant vessels and passenger liners into vessels similar to but more capable than previous merchant aircraft carriers, or create a new design for a cheap, lightly armed, and unarmoured ship similar to the American escort carriers. In December 1941, it was decided that a new design was the best option.

This ship was conceived as an intermediate step between the expensive fleet carriers and the limited-capability escort carriers. The design had to be as simple as possible so construction time was kept to a minimum and so more shipyards (particularly those with no naval construction experience) could be used. However, the ships had to be capable of operating in fleet actions. Originally designated the 'Intermediate Aircraft Carrier', the ships were reclassified as 'Light Fleet Carriers'. Because naval design staff were overworked, the carrier was primarily designed by shipbuilders at Vickers-Armstrong.

The Light Fleet design, completed at the start of 1942, was effectively a scaled-down Illustrious. The hull was built to Lloyd's specifications for merchant vessels from keel to maindeck, but incorporated better subdivision of compartments to reduce secondary damage by flooding.

The propulsion machinery was of a similar design to that used in cruisers—some of the steam turbines were sourced from cancelled cruisers. The machinery was arranged in two compartments (each containing two Admiralty 3-drum boilers and a Parsons geared turbine), which were staggered en echelon, with the starboard compartment forward of the port.

The carriers were intended to be 'disposable warships': to be scrapped and replaced at the end of the war or within three years of entering service. However, all exceeded this planned service life, with one ship operating from 1945 to 2001.

Colossus class
During 1942 and 1943, another fourteen Light Fleet carriers (named the Colossus class after the lead ship) were laid down under the 1942 Programme, to be constructed by eight British shipyards. Although it was originally planned that each Light Fleet would be ready for service in 21 months, modifications to the design saw the planned construction time increase to 27 months. Even with the omission of several important pieces of backup equipment, only two ships met this target.

The ships were launched from late 1943 onwards, with the first commissioned in December 1944.

During operational service, the living conditions aboard the Colossus-class ships were criticised, which resulted in the abolition of hammocks in favour of fixed bunks and the introduction of centralised eating arrangements in later warship designs.

Maintenance carriers
The impracticality of shore-based repair establishments in the Far East and Pacific theatres of the Second World War saw a requirement for aircraft maintenance carriers. Both ships were completed before the end of the war, with Pioneer sailing to the Pacific in company with the 11th Aircraft Carrier Squadron; Pioneer had repaired 24 aircraft since her arrival in the Pacific.

As the ships were designed with the repair and transportation of aircraft in mind, much of the equipment required for carrier flight operations, including control facilities, arresting gear, and catapult, were not installed. This space was instead used for additional hangar room, repair and maintenance workshops, and system testing facilities.

Majestic class
The six remaining Light Fleet hulls were originally to be completed as Colossus-class ships, but the rapid development of carrier-based aircraft and anti-aircraft weapons required modifications to the original design. The catapult, arrestor cables, and aircraft lifts had to be upgraded to handle faster and heavier aircraft, while the flight deck was reinforced. Improved weapons and radars were fitted, and equipment to perform replenishment at sea was installed. This led to the six ships being reclassified as the Majestic class in September 1945. Five carriers were launched before the end of the Second World War, with the sixth launched in late September 1945.

Following the war's end, work on the Majestic class was suspended, then restored to a low-priority status, with the rate of work increasing as foreign nations purchased the ships. Two, Magnificent and Terrible, entered service more-or-less as designed, but the next three were heavily upgraded with three British developments allowing the operation of larger, faster, jet-propelled aircraft: the angled flight deck, the steam catapult, and the mirror landing aid. The sixth, Leviathan, was not completed. Work was suspended in May 1946, and plans to convert her into a commando carrier or missile cruiser, or sell her to a foreign buyer, fell through. During the 1950s, she was used as an accommodation ship in Portsmouth Harbour and, in 1966, her boilers were removed and sold to the shipyard refitting the Colossus-class  for Argentine service. Leviathan was scrapped in May 1968. None of the completed Majestic-class vessels saw service in the Royal Navy.

In 1943, eight 'Improved Majestics' were planned, but developments in carrier aviation and the rapid obsolescence of the Light Fleets and the wartime armoured carriers required a larger and more capable design, which became the four-ship Centaur class.

Weapons

Aircraft

In the original design, each ship was capable of carrying 41 aircraft. A redesign of the available parking area on the flight deck in March 1942 saw the ships' air group expanded to 24 Fairey Barracuda torpedo bombers and 24 Supermarine Seafire fighters, or 18 Barracudas and 34 Seafires. In RN service, the Barracuda was later replaced by the Fairey Firefly, and the Seafire was superseded by the Hawker Sea Fury during the Korean War.

To launch and recover aircraft, the carriers were initially equipped with hydraulic catapults, arresting gear, and crash barriers. This allowed the Light Fleets to later operate aircraft that the fleet carriers, which generally had two hangars with lower clearance in each, could not. The hangar was serviced by two aircraft lifts.

Armament
The Light Fleets were the first British aircraft carriers where the ship's air group was seen as the 'main armament'; any mounted weapons were to be for close-range anti-aircraft defence. The Colossus design called for six quadruple barrelled 2 pounder gun mounts, and 16 twin Oerlikon 20 mm cannons. Two 4-inch (102 mm) guns were originally included, but an increase in the design's flight deck length in March 1942 saw them displaced. The ships were unarmoured, as increasing the size of the vessels was deemed more important than protection.

Lessons learned during the early part of the Pacific War showed the superiority of the Bofors 40 mm gun to other anti-aircraft weapons. By the end of the war, all Colossus-class ships had swapped all their other weapons for Bofors in single and twin mountings, and the Majestic design had been modified to carry 30 of the guns: 18 single mountings, and 6 twin mountings. The number of Bofors carried by the Light Fleets was reduced after the war, with British ships carrying only eight.

Royal Navy service

Second World War and aftermath
Although four Colossus-class ships were completed before the end of the war, they did not see front-line action: the war in Europe had proceeded to the point where aircraft carriers were of limited use, and by the time the carriers reached the Pacific, Japan had surrendered. The four ships, assigned to the British Pacific Fleet, were instead used for the transportation of returning soldiers and rescued prisoners-of-war, to help alleviate the shortage of troopships and liners. As with the Colossus class, the maintenance carriers were completed but did not enter active service before the end of the war. They were reclassified as Ferry Carriers, and used to transport aircraft to British bases and ships across the world.

During the late 1940s and early 1950s, the carriers were used as testbeds for new aircraft and technology. Throughout late 1945, Ocean was used to test several new aircraft: the Hawker Sea Fury and de Havilland Sea Hornet piston-engine fighters during August, and the de Havilland Sea Vampire jet-propelled fighter-bomber in December. On 3 December 1945, a de Havilland Sea Vampire became the first jet aircraft to land on a carrier—two months before, Oceans flight deck saw the last landing of a Fairey Swordfish torpedo bomber. The angled flight deck concept (which would later be installed on several of the Majestic-class carriers) was first trialled aboard Triumph: the straight-line deck markings were removed, and markings for an angled landing painted on. After a two-year loan to Canada, Warrior served as a testbed for rubberised flexible decks and skid-like landing gear during 1948 and 1949. During 1951 and 1952, Perseus was used as a trials ship for the under-development steam catapult.

Korean War
The Colossus class first saw combat during the Korean War. Following the invasion of South Korea by North Korea on 25 June, ships of the British Far East Fleet that were operating in Japanese waters, including the carrier , were placed under the United States Far East Commander, to operate in retaliation to the invasion under the instructions of the United Nations Security Council. The first carrier attack began on 3 July 1950, with aircraft from Triumph and United States carrier  performing air strikes on North Korean airfields.

The Light Fleets were cheaper to operate than the armoured fleet carriers while providing a similar sized air group, but during the war proved to be slower, less comfortable, and more prone to wear-and-tear than other RN carriers. Financial and manpower restrictions meant that only one Light Fleet could be deployed to Korea at a time.  also contributed to the Korean War effort by transporting replacement aircraft from the United Kingdom to British bases throughout the Far East region, which were then drawn upon by the active carriers.

Following the end of the Korean War, Warrior and Sydney returned to Korean waters on separate deployments, to ensure that the armistice was enforced and hostilities did not re-ignite.

Suez Crisis
The two ships were not used as aircraft carriers; instead they were equipped with helicopters and tasked with transporting ashore 45 Commando, a battalion of the Royal Marines, in order to secure harbours and other landing points for heavy equipment. This, the first ship-based helicopter assault, was successful, and prompted the development of the amphibious assault ship.

Decommissioning and disposal

The two maintenance carriers were decommissioned during the 1950s and scrapped: Pioneer was sold in 1954, and Perseus in 1958. With the exception of HMS Triumph, the Colossus-class carriers that remained in RN service were disposed of during the early 1960s. None was significantly modernised during its service life. Triumph left service in 1958, underwent a major conversion into a Heavy Repair Ship, and re-entered service in 1965.

Foreign service
As Britain was unable to maintain the size of her wartime fleet after the end of the Second World War, several Colossus-class ships were placed into reserve, while work on the Majestic class was initially halted at the end of the war, then restored to a low-priority status. Demands for fiscal cutbacks, combined with the rapid obsolescence of the carriers by the development of jet aircraft, saw four of the eight Colossuses and all five completed Majestics sold off to other nations.

The majority of the Light Fleets in foreign service were modernised, either during construction or afterwards, to operate jet aircraft.

Argentina

She was equipped with Vought F4U Corsair, and she was proved unsuitable for the Grumman F9F Panther jet fighters incorporated in 1963. Independencia was struck from service in 1971 and broken up for scrap.

Veinticinco de Mayo was initially equipped with F9F Panther and later with Douglas A-4 Skyhawk jet fighters; these were replaced with French Dassault Super Étendards in the 1980s. The carrier provided air cover for the Occupation of the Falkland Islands in April 1982. After hostilities broke out on 1 May 1982, it attempted an attack on the Royal Navy Task Force which did not take place, as poor winds prevented the heavily laden A-4Q jets from being launched. She remained confined to port for the rest of the Falklands War, particularly after the British submarine  sank the Argentine cruiser . Problems with her propulsion machinery meant that Veinticinco de Mayo was effectively inoperable from June 1986, although it was not until the start of 1999 that she was marked for scrapping.

Australia

In 1944, the Australian government suggested that Australian personnel be used to help counteract a personnel shortage in the Royal Navy by manning an aircraft carrier, one or more cruisers, and six destroyers. The Admiralty deemed a Colossus-class Light Fleet to be the most appropriate aircraft carrier, and Venerable was initially proposed for transfer to the Royal Australian Navy as a gift or on loan. The plan was deferred on the Australian end until a review of manpower requirements across the entire war effort was completed. The ship manning proposal was revisited in mid-1945, but the surrender of Germany in May meant that British shortages were not as problematic; as a counteroffer, the purchase of the Colossus-class Ocean by Australia was suggested. The Australian government decided against the purchase of Ocean in June.

Following the Second World War, a post-war review suggested that the Royal Australian Navy acquire three aircraft carriers as the core of a new fleet; funding restrictions saw the number of proposed carriers dropped to two. While waiting for Majestic/Melbourne to finish modernisation, the Colossus-class  was loaned to Australia from 1952 until 1955, allowing it to operate a two-carrier fleet.

The first aircraft carrier acquired by the Royal Australian Navy, Sydney was deployed to Korea in order to maintain a consistent Commonwealth carrier presence in the conflict. Operating between September 1951 and January 1952, Sydney was the first carrier owned by a Commonwealth Dominion to see combat. Reclassified as a training ship in 1955, Sydney was decommissioned in 1958 but reactivated in 1962 as a fast troop transport. In her troopship role, Sydney travelled to Vietnam 25 times between 1965 and 1972. She was decommissioned in November 1973, and sold to a South Korean company for scrapping in 1975.

Although deployed to the Far East Strategic Reserve on several occasions, and assigned to escort Sydney to and from Vietnam on three occasions, Melbourne was not directly involved in any conflict during her career. Melbourne was sold to China for scrapping in 1985; instead of being broken up, she was studied as part of the nation's top-secret carrier development program, and may not have been dismantled until 2002. There were plans to replace Melbourne with the British carrier , but Invincible was withdrawn from sale following her service in the Falklands War, and a 1983 election promise to not replace the carrier saw the end of Australian carrier-based fixed-wing aviation.

Brazil

After Vengeance was returned from her loan to Australia, she was sold to the Brazilian Navy on 14 December 1956. From mid-1957 until December 1960, the carrier underwent a massive refit and reconstruction at Verolme Dock in Rotterdam; the work performed included the installation of an 8.5-degree angled flight deck and a steam catapult, strengthening of arresting gear, and reinforcing of the hangar lifts. The carrier was commissioned into the Marinha do Brasil (MB, Brazilian Navy) as Minas Gerais on 6 December 1960.

The Brazilian carrier was equipped with Grumman S-2E Tracker fixed-wing aircraft, and Sikorsky ASH-3D Sea King, AS-355 Ecureuil, and AS332 Super Puma helicopters. Brazilian law prevented the MB from operating fixed-wing aircraft, so two separate air groups had to be embarked. In 1999, the MB acquired Douglas A-4KU Skyhawks—the first time Brazilian naval aviators were permitted to operate fixed-wing aircraft until the carrier's 2001 decommissioning. Minas Gerais was replaced by NAe São Paulo (the former French carrier ).

Minas Gerais was the last of the Second World War-era light aircraft carriers to leave service, and at the time of her decommissioning was the oldest active aircraft carrier in the world. The carrier was marked for sale in 2002, and was actively sought after by British naval associations for return to England and preservation as a museum ship, although they were unable to raise the required money. In December 2003 the carrier was listed for sale on auction website eBay, but was removed because the site's rules prevented the sale of military ordnance. Sometime between February and July 2004, the carrier was towed to the ship breaking yards at Alang, India, for dismantling.

Canada

Following wartime experience showing the effectiveness of naval aviation, the Royal Canadian Navy decided to acquire an aircraft carrier. The Canadian government decided to purchase the Majestic-class carrier Powerful, and have her upgraded to modern standards. The Colossus-class vessel  was transferred on a two-year loan from 1946 to 1948, so the experience gained by providing ship's companies for two British escort carriers during the war could be maintained. On her return to Britain, Warrior was used as a trials ship, then modernised before her sale to Argentina. The loan of Magnificent continued until Powerfuls completion in 1957, at which point Magnificent was returned to the British. She was to be sold to another nation, but after no buyers came forward, the carrier was scrapped.

In the meantime, Powerful had been upgraded to operate jet aircraft. The modifications included an 8° angled flight deck and steam catapult, and she was equipped with American weapons, radars, and jet aircraft instead of their British equivalents. The carrier's design could not keep up with the advances in naval aircraft during the early 1960s, and in 1964, the ship's McDonnell F2H Banshee fighters were removed, leaving an anti-submarine warfare (ASW) focused air group of Sikorsky CH-124 Sea King helicopters and Grumman S-2 Tracker ASW aircraft. Bonaventure received a major mid life refit in 1967, but was withdrawn in 1970 after defence cuts. Her departure marked the end of Canadian carrier-based aviation.

France
Lead ship  was loaned to the French Navy in August 1946 and renamed . The vessel remained in French service, and was purchased outright in 1951. She was deployed to French Indochina, and operated during the First Indochina War from 1949 to 1954. After the war's end, the carrier was assigned to the Mediterranean. She participated in the 1956 Suez Crisis, operating air strikes against Egyptian positions around Port Said. A modernisation from 1957 to 1958 saw the installation of a 4° angled flight deck and an optical landing system, allowing Arromanches to operate Breguet Alizé anti-submarine aircraft.

Arromanches was replaced in active service by the French-built Clemenceau class, and was converted into a training ship in 1960. Apart from a short stint as an anti-submarine carrier in 1968, the ship remained in this role until her 1974 decommissioning. Arromanches was broken up for scrap in 1978.

India

Work on the Majestic-class  was suspended in May 1946, with the ship about 75% complete. The carrier remained in an unfinished condition until January 1957, when she was purchased by the Indian Navy. Vikrant was not involved in the 1962 Sino-Indian War or the 1965 Indo-Pakistani War because she was docked for maintenance and refits on both occasions. She did operate during the 1971 Indo-Pakistani War, with her air group performing strike and interdiction operations in East Pakistan.

A major upgrade between 1979 and 1982 saw the carrier fitted with a new propulsion system, an updated radar suite, and a 9.75° ski-jump ramp to be used by Sea Harriers. The carrier was last deployed in 1994, and she was decommissioned in 1997. Vikrant helped the Indian Navy to become the dominant regional power.

Following her decommissioning, Vikrant was marked for preservation as a museum ship. Vikrant was opened to the public by the Indian Navy for short periods, but the inability to find an operating partner, lack of funds, and the deterioration of the ship led to the closure of the museum in 2012, and the sale of the vessel for ship breaking in early 2014.

Netherlands
Initially, the carrier operated piston-engined aircraft, but underwent modernisation from 1955 to 1958, including a steam catapult, reinforced flight deck and aircraft lifts, and an 8° angled deck. Between the upgrade and 1964, Karel Doorman possessed a mixed air group of jet fighters, anti-submarine aircraft, and helicopters; the fixed-wing aircraft were removed in that year.

In 1968, Karel Doorman was heavily damaged by fire. She was repaired with equipment stripped from other Light Fleet carriers in reserve and awaiting disposal. However, before the fire, the Royal Netherlands Navy was reconsidering carrier-based operation, and instead of returning her to service, Karel Doorman was sold to Argentina.

Ships

See also
List of ship classes of World War II

References

Bibliography
Books
 
 
 
 
 
 
 
 
 
 
 
 
 
 
 
 
 

Journal articles
 
 
 
 
 

Newspaper articles
 
 
 
 

Websites

Further reading

External links

 links to service histories

Light aircraft carrier classes
 
 
 
 
 
 
 
Ship classes of the Royal Navy